Ərəb may refer to:
 Ərəb, Agdash, Azerbaijan
 Ərəb, Khachmaz, Azerbaijan
 Ərəb, Masally, Azerbaijan
 Ərəb Qubalı, Azerbaijan
 Ərəb, Lachin, Azerbaijan
 Ərəb Yengicə, Azerbaijan